Vaa-o-Fonoti is a district on the north east coast of Upolu Island in Samoa, with a population (2016 Census) of 1,621, making it the least populated district in the country.

The district is 38 km2 and consists of a main area around Fagaloa Bay with nine villages and a small coastal exclave about 10 km further northwest, with the village of Faleāpuna (pop. 582). The district includes areas with significant conservation and cultural values. Vaa-o-Fonoti geographical boundaries are surrounded by the larger district of Atua. The capital of Vaa-o-Fonoti is Samamea.

The small settlement of Uafato is part of the Uafato Conservation Area, a project started by the villagers in the early 1990s, to protect their environment from logging. The area has gained a reputation in the last decade for woodcarving and traditional arts and crafts in Samoa.

Historical
Vaa-o-Fonoti was established within the district of Atua in the 16th century when Fonoti Tupu Tafaifa ('King') when he was  victorious in the preceding war with his siblings Vaafusuaga Toleafoa and Samalaulu. King Fonoti rewarded the people of this part of Atua for the role they played in securing his victory. Vaa-o-Fonoti ("The longboat or war canoe of Fonoti") is the honour bestowed upon the region for the bravery of the naval canoes who defeated Manono, Sapapalii and Saleaumua in the fighting that took part on the sea.

The paramount titles of the district is Ulualofaiga Talamaivao. There is no current occupant of the title.

Electoral results

See also
Fagaloa Bay – Uafato Tiavea Conservation Zone

References

 
Districts of Samoa